Woodbridge is a hamlet in Farway civil parish, south-south-east of the town of Honiton, in the English county of Devon. The OS grid reference is SY1895.

References 
 A-Z Great Britain Road Atlas (page 13)
 Ordnance Survey Explorer map 115, Exmouth & Sidmouth

Villages in Devon